Burnettweldia plumbella, also known as the beaked twig gall wasp, is a species of gall wasp. Previously in the genus Disholcaspis, it was moved into a new genus, Burnettweldia, in 2021. This wasp induces galls on oak trees, including blue oak, leather oak, Muller's oak, and scrub oaks. The galls are up to 15 mm in diameter and brightly colored, coming in either red with yellow spots or green with yellow spots. Their name comes from the galls' pointed tip. Galls are formed in spring and summer, and adults emerge from them in November and December. The adult wasps are 3–4 mm in length.

References

External links 

 Burnettweldia plumbella on gallformers
 Burnettweldia plumbella on BugGuide
 Photos hosted by University of California, Irvine

Cynipidae
Gall-inducing insects
Oak galls